Petr Zapalač (born 30 April 1987) is a Czech footballer currently playing for SFC Opava. On 27 October 2011 he received an 18-month worldwide ban for using performance-enhancing drug clenbuterol and was not permitted to play in any FIFA competition until 1 May 2013.

References

External links
 
 

1987 births
Living people
Czech footballers
Czech expatriate footballers
Association football midfielders
FC Baník Ostrava players
FK Dubnica players
1. SC Znojmo players
FK Viktoria Žižkov players
GKS Bełchatów players
SFC Opava players
FK Frýdek-Místek players
Expatriate footballers in Slovakia
Czech expatriate sportspeople in Slovakia
Expatriate footballers in Poland
Czech expatriate sportspeople in Poland
Czech First League players
I liga players
Slovak Super Liga players
Czech sportspeople in doping cases
Doping cases in association football